Iota Horologii, Latinized from ι Horologii, is a yellow-hued star approximately 56.5 light-years away in the Horologium constellation.  The star is classified as a G0Vp yellow dwarf (it has previously been classified as G3 and a subgiant [IV]).  It has a mass and radius larger than the Sun, and is about 50% more luminous.

In 1999, a planet of the star was discovered. Because the planet orbits in a near Earth orbit, Iota Horologii was ranked 69th in the list of candidates for NASA's planned Terrestrial Planet Finder mission.  In 2000, a dust disc was announced around the star, but this was later determined to be an instrumental artifact.

Distance and visibility
Since Iota Horologii is in the minor constellation of Horologium and is quite dim in the sky, it has not been given a traditional name.  It lies roughly between the stars Eta Horologii and R Horologii (though it is not close to them in real space).

In its current position, Iota Horologii is closest to the star Chi Eridani (a yellow subgiant), approximately 7 light-years away.  The closest planetary systems to Iota Horologii are HD 10647 (a yellow dwarf), approximately 57 light-years away, and Epsilon Reticuli (an orange subgiant), approximately 59 light-years away.  Other star systems close to Iota Horologii include Nu Phoenicis and Zeta Reticuli.

Properties
Spectrographic analysis indicates the star must have formed together with the stars of the Hyades cluster (~625 million years ago) but must have slowly drifted away, being presently more than 130 light-years away from its original birthplace. The metallicity of the star matches the abundances found in the Hyades, indicating that the metals (elements heavier than helium) in the atmosphere were not acquired because it engulfed planetary material.

Measurements of magnetic activity with the 1.5 m telescope at Cerro Tololo Inter-American Observatory show that the star has a 1.6 year magnetic activity cycle which, as of 2010, is the shortest cycle measured so far for a solar like star. The sun by comparison has an 11-year magnetic activity cycle. There may be a second, longer cycle which modulates the 1.6 year cycle.

Planetary system
Iota Horologii b is believed to be Jupiter-sized. The planet's discovery was the result of a survey of forty stars that began in November 1992.

Stability analysis reveals that the orbits of Earth-sized planets located in the planet's trojan points would be stable for long periods of time.

Based on residuals in the radial velocity curve, a planet in an eccentric orbit with a period of approximately 600 days was proposed, but this was not confirmed and it seems likely that the effect was due to activity on Iota Horologii itself.

An astrometric measurement of the planet's inclination and true mass was published in 2022 as part of Gaia DR3.

See also
 Gliese 570

References

External links
 
 
 
 

Horologii, Iota
CD-51 00641
017051
012653
0810
0108
Horologium (constellation)
Planetary systems with one confirmed planet
G-type main-sequence stars
Hyades (star cluster)